The portion of the inferior frontal lobe immediately adjacent to the longitudinal fissure (and medial to the medial orbital gyrus and olfactory tract) is named the straight gyrus,(or gyrus rectus) and is continuous with the superior frontal gyrus on the medial surface.

A specific function for the straight gyrus has not yet been brought to light; however, in males, greater activation of the straight gyrus within the medial orbitofrontal cortex while observing sexually visual pictures has been strongly linked to HSDD (hypoactive sexual desire disorder).

Additional images

References

External links

 
 
 http://www.gesundheit.de/roche/pics/s13048.000-3.html
 NIF Search - Gyrus Rectus via the Neuroscience Information Framework

Gyri
Medial surface of cerebral hemisphere